Abrota is a monotypic butterfly genus in the family Nymphalidae. Its only species is Abrota ganga, the sergeant-major.

Range
It is found in Sikkim, Bhutan, Abor Hills, Naga Hills, Burma, western China (Sichuan, Yunnan), Taiwan, Guangdong and Shanxi.

In 1932 William Harry Evans described the species as not rare.

Description

The sergeant-major is 70 to 90 mm in wingspan.

The male sergeant-major is tawny with dark bands. The upper hindwing has four bands, of which the central two are well-separated in the wet-season form and nearly united in the dry-season form.

The female is dark brown with dusky tawny bands. The upper forewing has a streak in the cell with a spot beyond while the upper hindwing has two tawny bands.

Subspecies
Abrota ganga ganga (Bhutan, Sikkim, Assam, Burma, Metok)
Abrota ganga formosana Fruhstorfer, 1909 (Taiwan)
Abrota ganga flavina Mell, 1923 (China: Guangdong)
Abrota ganga pratti Leech, 1891 (western China: Sichuan, Yunnan)
Abrota ganga riubaensis Yoshino, 1997 (China: Shaanxi)

See also
List of butterflies of India (Limenitidinae)

References

Butterflies of Asia
Limenitidinae
Butterflies described in 1857
Taxa named by Frederic Moore
Monotypic butterfly genera